Ponciano Arriaga International Airport  is an international airport located at San Luis Potosí, San Luis Potosi, Mexico. It handles national and international air traffic for the city of San Luis Potosí.

Information 
In 2020, the airport handled 309,311 passengers, and in 2021 it handled 528,625 passengers.

Airlines and destinations

Passengers

Cargo

Statistics

Passengers

Busiest routes

Incidents and accidents
 On November 4, 2008, former Secretary of the interior Juan Camilo Mouriño was killed when the SEGOB-owned Learjet he was travelling on his way back from San Luis Potosí crashed at Mexico City before reaching the airport.

See also 

List of the busiest airports in Mexico

References

External links
 Grupo Aeroportuario Centro Norte de México
 Aeropuerto de San Luis Potosí

Airports in San Luis Potosí
San Luis Potosí City